The 2017 WPA World Nine-ball Junior Championship was a professional youth 9-Ball World Championship held between October 30 and November 2, 2017. The event was split into three competitions, Under 17s, boys and girls. Sanjin Pehlivanović won the U17 event, defeating Robbie Capito in the final, with Fjodor Gorst winning the boys event. Kristina Tkatsch won the girls event defeating South Korea's Lee Woo-jin in the final.

Results

Competitions

Under 17s event

Preliminary round 
The following players were eliminated in the preliminary round:
 Round 1 (17–23 Place)
  Khalid Omar Alghamdi
  Brenden Croft
  Roman Grischin
  Stephanus Grove
  Gyairon Martis
  Vian Smithers
  Wang Wei-cheng

  Round 2 (13–16 Place)
  Dean Cuillerier
  Craig Petersen
  Seo Young-won
  Joshua Shultz

 Round 3 (9.–12. Place)
  Stanislaw Achtjamow
  Danylo Kaljajew
  Eric Roberts
  Joey Tate

Finals

Boys event

Preliminary round 
The following players were eliminated in the preliminary round:
 Round 1 (17.–24. Place)
  Sulaiman Aljulaidan
  William Hunkins
  Alexander Kirin
  Wladimir Matwijenko
  Peter Nwaila
  Clint Petersen
  Tseveennamjil Taivanbat
  Tanaka Taiki

 Round 2 (13.–16. Place)
  Luciano Ayala
  Kim Dae-hyun
  Ilja Nekleionow
  Sugayama Kouki

 Round 3 (9.–12. Place)
  Alexis Groshaus
  Hsu Yi-fu
  David Kriel
  Austin Summers

Finals

Girls event

Preliminary round 
The following players were eliminated in the preliminary round:
 Round 1 (17.–21. Place)
  Ashley Fullerton
  Darja Gorkowa
  Wiktorija Gurowa
  Walerija Popowa
  Savanna Wolford

 Round 2 (13.–16. Place)
  Hailey Fullerton
  Hsu Fang-yu
  Vivian Liu
  Daryna Sirantschuk

 Round 3 (9.–12. Place)
  Nataly Damian
  Weronika Karwik
  Okuda Tamami
  Jiang Yixia

Finals

References

External links

2017 in cue sports
2017 in Russian sport
WPA World Nine-ball Junior Championship